Mevik Chapel is a chapel of the Church of Norway in Gildeskål Municipality in Nordland county, Norway. It is located in the village of Mevik. It is an annex chapel in the Gildeskål parish which is part of the Bodø domprosti (deanery) in the Diocese of Sør-Hålogaland. The white, wooden chapel was built in a long church style in 1910. The chapel seats about 240 people. The building was renovated in 1957.

See also
List of churches in Sør-Hålogaland

References

Gildeskål
Churches in Nordland
Wooden churches in Norway
20th-century Church of Norway church buildings
Churches completed in 1910
1910 establishments in Norway
Long churches in Norway